The Kersttrofee Hofstade is a cyclo-cross race held in Hofstade, Belgium, which is part of the UCI Cyclo-cross World Cup. The race is held every year during Christmas.

Past winners

References
 Men's results
 Women's results

UCI Cyclo-cross World Cup
Cycle races in Belgium
Cyclo-cross races
Recurring sporting events established in 2001
2001 establishments in Belgium
Sport in Flemish Brabant